During the 2007 Rugby World Cup qualification, there were two repechage positions available for the finals tournament.

Repechage 1

Portugal win 26-20 on aggregate and advances to Round 2.

Portugal win 24-23 on aggregate and goes to the 2007 Rugby World Cup, in group C.

Repechage 2

Tonga qualified as Repechage 2.

External links
 World Cup website

2007
Repechage
2007 in Moroccan sport
2007 in Portuguese sport
2007 in Uruguayan sport
World Cup
2007 in South Korean sport